The Nicaraguan seed finch (Sporophila nuttingi) is a species of bird in the family Thraupidae. It is found in Costa Rica, Nicaragua and northwestern Panama.

Its natural habitats are subtropical or tropical moist shrubland, swamps, and heavily degraded former forest.

The scientific name of this bird commemorates the zoologist Charles Cleveland Nutting.

References

Nicaraguan seed finch
Birds of Nicaragua
Birds of Costa Rica
Nicaraguan seed finch
Taxa named by Robert Ridgway
Taxonomy articles created by Polbot